Kauaiina alakaii is a moth of the family Geometridae first described by Jules C. E. Riotte in 1979. It is endemic to the eastern part of the Hawaiian island of Kauai, where it was collected in the Alakai Swamp, after which it is named.

References

Larentiinae
Endemic moths of Hawaii
Biota of Kauai
Moths described in 1979